Arphaxed Loomis (April 9, 1798September 15, 1885) was an American lawyer and judge.  He was a member of the U.S. House of Representatives, representing New York's 16th district during the 25th Congress (1837–1839). His unusual first name is from a character in the Bible, a grandson of Noah named Arphacshad.

Early career 
Born in Winsted, Connecticut, Loomis moved to New York in 1801 with his parents, who settled upon a farm in the town of Salisbury, Herkimer County. 

He attended the common schools and Fairfield Academy, Fairfield, New York.  He studied law, was admitted to the bar at Albany in 1822 and commenced practice at Sackets Harbor, New York, the same year.

Career 
He returned to Salisbury in 1825, but later in that year moved to Little Falls, New York, and continued the practice of his profession. He was surrogate of Herkimer County from 1828 to 1836, and as commissioner to investigate the State prisons in 1834.  He was county judge of Herkimer County in 1835–1840.

Congress 
Loomis was elected as a Democrat to the Twenty-fifth Congress (March 4, 1837 – March 3, 1839).
He served as chairman of the Committee on Patents (Twenty-fifth Congress).  He was not a candidate for renomination in 1838.

Later career 
He served as member of the New York State Assembly in 1841 and 1842.  He served as a member of the State constitutional convention in 1846.  He served as a member of the commission to revise, abridge, and simplify pleadings and proceedings in civil actions in 1847.  He was again a member of the New York State Assembly in 1853 and 1854.  He served as a delegate to the Democratic State conventions in 1861 and 1863.

Death and burial 
He died at Little Falls, New York, September 15, 1885.  He was interred in the Church Street Cemetery.

References and sources

	

1798 births
1885 deaths
New York (state) state court judges
People from Winsted, Connecticut
People from Salisbury, Herkimer County, New York
Democratic Party members of the New York State Assembly
Democratic Party members of the United States House of Representatives from New York (state)
People from Little Falls, New York
19th-century American politicians
19th-century American judges